The 2016–17 season was Norwich City's return to the Football League Championship, having been relegated from the Premier League last season. This season they participated in the Championship, FA Cup and League Cup. The Norwich City development squad also participated in the EFL Trophy. The fixture list for the season was announced on 22 June 2016, and the Championship season began on 6 August 2016. The season covered the period from 1 July 2016 to 30 June 2017.

First-team squad

Out on loan

Transfers

In

Total spending: £10,550,000

Out

Total incoming: £10,500,000

Loans in

Loans out

Pre-season friendlies
On 27 May 2016, Norwich City announced their pre-season schedule, which included a week long pre-season training camp in Burgenland, Austria. Their opponents for the two friendlies in Austria were later announced as FK Dukla Prague and Rubin Kazan. On 9 June 2016, they announced that Norwich's final pre-season friendly would be against Hannover 96.

Competitions

Overview

Championship

League table

Results by matchday

Results summary

Matches
The Championship fixture list was released on 22 June 2016. Norwich's first game was away to Blackburn Rovers.

FA Cup

EFL Cup

Statistics

Appearances, goals and cards

Goalscorers

References

Norwich City F.C. seasons
Norwich City